Melon Diesel (also known as Treehouse) is aGibraltarian pop music band originally formed in Gibraltar in 1995, signed by Sony Music, who achieved popularity in Spain.

History
Melon Diesel started playing under the name of 'Treehouse' in the early 1990s. The name was changed in 1995, based on an alcoholic drink served at a Gibraltar bar, The Admiral Collingwood, where the band used to perform regularly. The group moved to Madrid,Spain in the late nineties to try their luck and eventually got signed by Sony music,Spain.For their first album they moved to London to work with producer Barry Sage, recording La Cuesta de Mr. Bond' at Chapel Studios in Lincolnshire and Moody Studios in London.La Cuesta de Mister Bond went Platinum selling around 180,000 copies.After a very long tour of over 100 shows in support of their first album through Spain they recorded the follow up album "Hombre en el Espejo" in Eurosonic Studios,Madrid with producer Nigel Walker.In 2003 they would record their last studio album with the original line up in Treviso,Venice(Italy) with producer Danilo Ballo'.
The group split up in 2003 forming two new bands, Area 52 and Taxi.

While Area 52 has remained in the local circuit in Gibraltar, Taxi retains frontman Dylan Ferro and have released five albums with some commercial success in Spain,and keeping alive Melon Diesel's legacy.

Band members
Former members
 Dylan Ferro – lead vocals (1995–2003)
 Daniel Bugeja – guitars (1995–2003)
 Daniel Fa – guitars (1995–2003)
 Guy Palmer – bass (1995–2003)
 Adrian Pozo – drums (1995–2003)

Discography
1999: La Cuesta de Mister Bond 
2001: Hombre en el Espejo2003: Real''

References

External links
 Archived official website. 
 Archived fanclub site. 
 Discography index.

British pop rock music groups
Gibraltarian musical groups
Musical groups established in 1995
Musical groups disestablished in 2003
Musical groups reestablished in 2021